Mashup may refer to:

 Mashup (culture), the rearrangement of spliced parts of musical pieces as part of a subculture
 Mashup (education), combining various forms of data and media by a teacher or student in an instructional setting
 Mashup (music), a song or composition created by blending two or more pre-recorded songs
 Mashup (video), a video that is edited from multiple sources to appear unified
 Mashup novels, a type of fiction combining pre-existing literature with other genres to create a single narrative
 Mashup (web application hybrid), a web application that combines content from more than one source in a single graphical interface
 "Mash-Up" (Glee), the eighth episode of the American television series Glee, first aired in 2009
 Mash Up (TV series), a 2012 American television show on Comedy Central starring T.J. Miller

See also 

 Band Mashups, the former name of the video game Battle of the Bands
 Google Mashup Editor
 Lotus Mashups, a business mashups editor
 Quodlibet
 
 
 Mash (disambiguation)
 Mashed (disambiguation)
 Masher (disambiguation)
 Mish Mash (disambiguation)

da:Mash-up